Medanales is an unincorporated community located in Rio Arriba County, New Mexico, United States. Medanales has a post office with ZIP code 87548, which opened on March 10, 1945.

Demographics

Education
It is in Española Public Schools. The comprehensive public high school is Española Valley High School.

Notable people 

 Agueda Salazar Martínez (1898—2000), New Mexican Hispanic weaver, "head of the largest family of Hispanic weavers in the state", moved to Medanales in 1924

References

Bibliography

 

Unincorporated communities in Rio Arriba County, New Mexico
Unincorporated communities in New Mexico